K-Trumpism or K-Trump is a term used in the political context of South Korea and is related to the current president of South Korea, Yoon Suk-yeol. Depending on the situation, it is also simply referred to as Trumpism (트럼프주의 or 트럼피즘).

Some media and expert outlets have described hiis political positions as "right-wing populist", "Trumpist", and "far-right" because of Yoon Suk-yeol's anti-Chinese rhetoric, right-wing nationalist nature, hostile attitude toward opposition and the critical media, hardline social conservatism, negative attitudes toward feminism, and positive attitudes toward possessing nuclear weapons. Yoon Suk-yeol and his supporters deny allegations that he is far-right or a Trumpist. However, unlike the original-Trumpism, anti-immigration attitude is not noticeable.

The term was also used to point out the controversy over anti-feminism by Lee Jun-seok, the former party leader of the PPP. Historically, this term has also been used to refer to Hong Joon-pyo's right-wing nationalist tendencies. Prior to the rise of Yoon Suk-yeol and Lee Jun-seok, Hong Joon-pyo was mainly compared to Donald Trump.

See also 
 Anti-feminism
 Idaenam
 National conservatism
 People Power Party (South Korea)
 South Korea and weapons of mass destruction

Notes

References 

Trumpism
Alt-right in Asia
Anti-Chinese sentiment in South Korea
Anti-communism in South Korea
Far-right politics in South Korea
Fascism in South Korea
National conservatism
Opposition to feminism in South Korea
Right-wing ideologies
Right-wing populism in South Korea
Yoon Suk-yeol